Lieutenant-General Sir Geoffrey Weston Howard,  (14 December 1876 – 3 October 1966) was a British Army officer who commanded the 5th Division.

Military career
Howard was commissioned into the Essex Regiment as a second lieutenant on 1 December 1897. He served with the 1st battalion of his regiment in South Africa during the Second Boer War. The battalion was present at the operations around Colesberg in January 1900, following which he was promoted to lieutenant on 29 January 1900; then took part in the battle of Paardeberg (February 1900) and the subsequent march to Bloemfontein, during which he was aide-de-camp (ADC) to Brigadier General Theodore Stephenson. His battalion joined the force that subsequently went to occupy Pretoria, and took part in the engagement at the Vet River, and the battles of Diamond Hill (June 1900) and Belfast (August 1900). For his service in the war, he received the Distinguished Service Order (DSO) in the October 1902 South African honours list. After the war ended in June 1902, Howard stayed in South Africa as ADC to Stephenson, who was now Major-General in Command at Bloemfontein district.

He served in World War I in Malta, France and Italy. In October 1918, at the end of the War, he was made Commander of 145th Brigade.

He was appointed Deputy Director for Organisation at the War Office in 1921, General Staff Officer at Aldershot Command in 1924 and Commander 9th Infantry Brigade in 1927. He went on to be Major-General in charge of Administration at Eastern Command in 1931 and General Officer Commanding (GOC) of the 5th Division in Egypt, Palestine during the Arab revolt and Transjordan in 1934 before retiring in 1938.

He was given the Colonelcy of the Essex Regiment from 1935 to 1946.

Family
In 1905 he married Meta Minnie Gregory; they had a son and a daughter.

References

|-

1876 births
1966 deaths
Burials in Berkshire
British Army generals of World War I
British Army personnel of the Second Boer War
British military personnel of the 1936–1939 Arab revolt in Palestine
Companions of the Distinguished Service Order
Companions of the Order of St Michael and St George
Essex Regiment officers
Knights Commander of the Order of the Bath
People from Wyre Forest District
Military personnel from Worcestershire
British Army lieutenant generals